Bombyx shini is a moth in the family Bombycidae. It was described by Kyu-Tek Park and Jae-Cheon Sohn in 2002. It is found in Korea.

References

Bombycidae
Moths described in 2002